The CB 750 K(Z) (model RC01) is a motorcycle model by the Japanese vehicle manufacturer Honda.

The new 750 
At the 1978 IFMA in Cologne the new CB 750 was presented as the successor to the CB 750 four for Europe and available for sale  later that year. With a new DOHC engine design and numerous other new features it was presented as "what happens when you keep winning races".

New features 
The DOHC 16 valve engine was based on the engine in the RCB943 and RCB997 featuring four valves per cylinder, and next to the timing chain driving the exhaust cam, a second chain driving the intake cam.

The engine was also better balanced by moving the alternator from the left to the right side.

Next to the new engine, new features like the transistorized ignition system was promising smooth performance and greater economy. 
It had increased breaking performance with double discs up front and a lower, deeply padded seat for greater riding comfort and handling.
Increased suspension travel for the front forks and rear FVQ damper, and a taper roller bearing for the head for smoother riding.
Improved safety features like an H4 headlamp and double rear brake light bulbs were also advertised.

Technical details

Engine and power transmission
Air-cooled 4-cylinder 4-stroke engine with chain driven camshaft (DOHC), 4 valves per cylinder (total of 16), via tappets actuated
Power: 57 kW (77 hp at 9,000 min -1 .), Max torque 66 Nm at 7000 min -1
Average piston speed : 2.07 m / s per 1,000 min −1
Top speeds: 200 km / h (lying solo), 187 km / h (sitting solo), 179 km / h (with pillion passenger)
743 cm³ displacement with  bore and  stroke
Compression ratio 9: 1
Electric starter
Contactless transistor-controlled battery ignition with mechanical centrifugal force adjustment
Pressure circulation lubrication
One-piece steel crankshaft with 5 sliding bearings
4 Keihin equal pressure carburetors with a diameter of 
Wet multi-plate clutch
Constant-mesh 5-speed gear
Three-phase - alternator (260 Watt at 5000 min -1 ), battery (12 V / 14 Ah)
4-in-4 exhaust system (sometimes shown as 4-in-2-in-4)
Primary drive via inverted tooth chain
Secondary drive via roller chain

Frame
Double-loop tubular steel frame with a single-sided unscrewable support on the right for (dis) assembly of the motor
Rear swing arm stored in plastic bushings (needle roller bearings from the end of 1980)
Ground clearance 
Foot peg height 
Hydraulically damped telescopic fork at the front with  travel
2 hydraulically damped spring struts at the rear, springs adjustable in 5 positions
Double  disc brake with single-piston calipers at the front
Simplex drum brake  at the rear
Comstar aluminum wheels with tubeless tires (3.25-19 / 4.00-18)
 steel tank

Colors 
The CB 750 K (Z) was available in four base colors: blue, black, red and brown.

References 

Honda motorcycles